Abdelmajid El Hissouf (born 23 September 1992) is a Moroccan long distance runner. He finished 68th in the marathon at the 2016 Summer Olympics.

References

External links

 

1992 births
Living people
Moroccan male long-distance runners
Moroccan male marathon runners
Place of birth missing (living people)
Athletes (track and field) at the 2016 Summer Olympics
Olympic athletes of Morocco
20th-century Moroccan people
21st-century Moroccan people